The constitutions of Czechoslovakia were in use from 1918 to the dissolution of the state in 1992. The first constitution was adapted and put in place following the separation of Bohemia from the Austria-Hungary empire.

The former country of Czechoslovakia had several constitutions, as described in the following articles:

1918 Constitution of Czechoslovakia (provisional)
Czechoslovak Constitution of 1920
Ninth-of-May Constitution, 1948
1960 Constitution of Czechoslovakia
Constitutional Law of Federation, 1968

See also
Constitution of the Czech Republic
Constitution of the Slovak Republic